A Girl with Temperament (German: Ein Mädel mit Temperament) is a 1928 German silent comedy film directed by Victor Janson and starring Maria Paudler, Eugen Neufeld and Luigi Serventi. It was shot at the EFA Studios in Berlin. The film's art direction was by Otto Erdmann and Hans Sohnle.

Cast
 Maria Paudler as Lillebil  
 Eugen Neufeld as Tobias Budd, Lillebils Vater  
 Luigi Serventi as Prinz Solm  
 Paul Biensfeldt as Take Miliescu  
 Grit Haid as Prinzessin Gaby  
 Margot Landa as Rita  
 Kurt Vespermann as Bela Körtecz  
 Harry Gondi as Werner Straaten  
 Dene Morel as Charlie Toddie  
 Gertrud de Lalsky as Minchen Minding  
 Ernst Udet as Kunstflieger - Himself

References

Bibliography
 Alfred Krautz. International directory of cinematographers, set- and costume designers in film, Volume 4. Saur, 1984.

External links

1928 films
Films of the Weimar Republic
German silent feature films
Films directed by Victor Janson
Films based on German novels
German black-and-white films
Films shot at Halensee Studios
1928 comedy films
German comedy films
1920s German-language films